Betty June Chamberlain (formerly Manhire, née Blackburn; 29 June 1933 – 13 July 2005) was a New Zealand long jumper who represented her country at the 1954 British Empire and Commonwealth Games.

Born on 29 June 1933, Blackburn represented New Zealand alongside Yvette Williams in the women's long jump at the 1954 British Empire and Commonwealth Games in Vancouver.

She was married twice: firstly to Thomas Richard Manhire until their divorce in 1973; and then to Wallace Ronald Chamberlain. She died on 13 July 2005.

References 

1933 births
2005 deaths
Commonwealth Games competitors for New Zealand
Athletes (track and field) at the 1954 British Empire and Commonwealth Games
New Zealand female long jumpers